Cristian Harson Bonilla Garzón (born 2 June 1993) is a retired Colombian professional footballer who played as a goalkeeper.

Bonilla made his debut within the Colombian top tier at only 16 years of age with Boyacá Chicó, before eventually signing with Colombian giants Atletico Nacional, where he went on to win a double in his debut year, winning both the Copa Colombia title and the very first Superliga Colombiana.

He represented Colombia at the 2011 Toulon Tournament, where he was the best player of the final, as he went on to save two penalties in the penalty shoot out against France. Colombia went on to beat France 3–1, thus obtaining Colombia's 3rd title at the tournament. He featured in all of Colombia's matches at the 2011 FIFA U-20 World Cup, where the hosts reached the quarter-finals. He was also the starting choice for the 2013 South American Youth Championship, where Colombia won their 3rd title.

Club career

Boyacá Chicó
Bonilla began his career in Boyacá Chicó. He made his debut at sixteen in the Copa Colombia.  He appeared in several games with Chicó in the 2010 season. On 1 June 2012, it was announced that Bonilla would be sent on loan to Atlético Nacional with a buying option.

Atlético Nacional

2012
With both Nacional goalkeepers Gastón Pezzuti and Franco Armani injured, Bonilla would be the first choice goalkeeper for the rest of the 2012 season. He made his official debut with Los Verdolagas on 22 July 2012 against Junior in the second leg of the Superliga Colombiana, a match that ended 3–0 favoring Nacional. This was his first clean sheet for the club as well as the first title of his club career.

He made his first league appearance on 29 July 2012 against Deportivo Cali, conceding three goals in a 3–1 loss.

Bonilla's second title would come in the 2012 Copa Colombia final against Deportivo Pasto. Due to his effective performance, Bonilla was able to achieve two clean sheets in the two-leg series. On 24 November 2012, Bonilla was put on the bench for the first time during his time with Nacional in a match against Itagüí. As a result of Pezzuti's recovery, Bonilla would compete for a spot in the starting eleven. However, due to what Bonilla had achieved to the moment with the club, Pezutti would be relegated to the bench. Armani was still recovering him his injury.

Equidad Seguros (loan)
He was loaned at Bogota based club La Equidad in 2015. He went on to perform an impressive season, resulting in a call up for the Colombia national football team.

Return to Atlético Nacional
In December 2015 Bonilla extended his link to the club, until 2018. He returns to Atlético Nacional in 2016.

Al-Fayha
Cristian Bonilla joined Saudi Pro League side Al-Fayha.

International career
Bonilla had his first international experience with the Colombian U-17 side disputing the 2009 South American Under-17 Football Championship, securing a fourth-place finish to qualify for the 2009 FIFA U-17 World Cup where Colombia had also finished fourth. Bonilla was part of the U-20 team that won the 2011 Toulon Tournament. He was selected to be the starting goalkeeper for the 2011 FIFA U-20 World Cup hosted in Colombia.

His previous talents representing Colombia over these recent years led him to return to the U20 team at the 2013 South American Youth Championship. He was selected as the number 1 goalkeeper playing in every match with the exception of the final where Colombia won their 3rd South American Youth title. He was praised for his impressive improvement since the last youth tournaments.

Bonilla made a return to the Toulon Tournament in the 2013 edition, where he made it to the finals with Colombia. However, Colombia gave away the sole winning goal in the first half in a 1–0 loss against Brazil. Despite this, he won the Meilleur gardien award.

Senior
On 11 May 2015, Bonilla was included in Colombia's 30-man preliminary squad for the 2015 Copa América. On 30 May 2015 he was put on the final 23-man list for the Copa América as the third choice keeper behind Camilo Vargas and David Ospina as the starting goalkeeper in the tournament. Bonilla did not make an appearance in the cup.

The following year he made the cut for Colombia's squad for the Copa América Centenario. Just as in his previous participation he did not play any matches.

Honours

Club
Atlético Nacional
Categoría Primera A (3): 2013-I, 2013-II, 2014-I
Copa Colombia (2): 2012, 2013
Superliga Colombiana (1): 2012
Copa Libertadores (1): 2016

International
Colombia U-20
Toulon Tournament (1): 2011
South American Youth Championship (1): 2013

Colombia
Copa América: Third place 2016

Individual
 Toulon Tournament 2013 voted Meilleur Gardien.

References

External links

 Profile at BDFA
 

1993 births
Living people
People from Manizales
Colombian footballers
Colombian expatriate footballers
Colombia youth international footballers
Association football goalkeepers
Categoría Primera A players
Saudi Professional League players
Boyacá Chicó F.C. footballers
Atlético Nacional footballers
La Equidad footballers
Al-Fayha FC players
Millonarios F.C. players
San Antonio FC players
Colombia under-20 international footballers
2015 Copa América players
Copa América Centenario players
Footballers at the 2016 Summer Olympics
Olympic footballers of Colombia
Colombian expatriate sportspeople in Saudi Arabia
Expatriate footballers in Saudi Arabia
Colombian expatriate sportspeople in the United States
Expatriate soccer players in the United States